Little Sister is a Dutch award-winning drama film released in 1995 and directed by Robert Jan Westdijk. Little Sister earned the Special Jury Prize at the 8th Yubari International Fantastic Film Festival in February 1997. It also won the Golden Calf for Best Feature Film.

Plot
Martijn, after the absence of many years, starts following around his sister Daantje with a movie camera.
He claims to make a documentary about her. Soon unravels an unresolved issue from a distant past that Daantje doesn't want to be reminded of anymore. It gradually becomes clear how Martijns obsession for his younger sister arose.

Cast
 Kim van Kooten as Daantje
 Romijn Conen as Martijn (credited as Martijn Zuidewind)
 Hugo Metsers as Martijn (voice)
 Bert Pot as Martijn, subjective camera
 Roeland Fernhout as Ramon
 Ganna Veenhuysen as Ingeborg
 Hannah Risselada as Little Daantje
 Michael Münninghoff as Little Martijn
 Alenka Dorrele as Mother Zuidewind
 Peter Idenburg as Father Zuidewind
 Taco Keer as Bas
 Marianne Jeuken as Neighbour
 Carl Wünderlich as Marketender
 Herman Brood as Ramon's upper neighbour
 Eulalia Montseré as Spanish friend

References

External links 
 

1995 films
1990s Dutch-language films
1995 drama films
Films set in the Netherlands
Incest in film
Films about siblings
Dutch drama films